Igor Beretić (Serbian Cyrillic: Игор Беретић) (born May 31, 1981 in Novi Sad, SR Serbia, SFR Yugoslavia) is a Serbian swimmer. 

Beretić represented Serbia and Montenegro at the 2004 Summer Olympics. He participated in one single event - the Men's 100 metres Backstroke.

See also
 List of Serbian records in swimming

References
Biography and olympic results

1981 births
Living people
Serbian male swimmers
Swimmers at the 2004 Summer Olympics
Sportspeople from Novi Sad
Olympic swimmers of Serbia and Montenegro